Mickey's Surprise Party is a 1939 American animated short film directed by Hamilton Luske, produced by Walt Disney Productions and distributed by Nabisco. It was the 105th short in the Mickey Mouse film series to be released, and the second for that year. Mickey's Surprise Party is the first cartoon with Mickey and Minnie Mouse in their current designs, created by animator Fred Moore.

This is notable for being the first Disney product of any kind to be sponsored by a company. Commonly thought to be in the public domain, its copyright was renewed in on May 2, 1966. Walt Disney hated the idea of public commercials, and avoided commercial entanglements until then. The cartoon had its premiere at the Golden Gate International Exposition (GGIE) on Treasure Island in San Francisco in February 1939. The film was shown in the "Food and Beverages" building in the Nabisco Theater. Walt was present at the fair for the premiere of the short. It was also shown in the Nabisco Theater at the New York World's Fair in 1939, which did not open until April. The two versions were identical except that the Nabisco products (cookies and crackers) featured at the end were different, reflecting products available on the west and east coasts.

In the short, Pluto's romantic partner is Fifi, a Pekingese who also appears in Puppy Love (1933), Pluto's Quin-puplets (1937) and Society Dog Show (1939).

Plot
Minnie bakes cookies to impress Mickey. Just as she leaves, however, her dog, Fifi, accidentally knocks popcorn into her batter while chasing a fly. Minnie, none the wiser, puts the batter in the oven. Minnie then prepares for the visit, as does Fifi. Mickey and Pluto then arrive. Minnie accepts Mickey's flowers, but Fifi rejects Pluto's bone for some reason. Unfortunately, Minnie has baked the cookies too long, burning them. Mickey smells the smoke and Minnie, suddenly remembering her cookies, runs into the kitchen. As she takes them out, the corn starts popping, but not before Pluto eats one, leading to him having an exploding cookie stuck in his belly while Mickey fights the burnt cookies with a water sprayer (with water filled from Minnie's goldfish bowl).

Minnie is then seen crying on the couch, saying that she wanted to bake cookies just like Mickey's mother. Mickey tries to comfort her, saying "My mother used to burn them all the time!" which made her cry even louder, however, which leads to Fifi crying too. With Minnie already in misery, Mickey immediately gets an idea and he and Pluto rush to the market, where they hastily return with their surprise package. Minnie no sooner turns around and sees that Mickey and Pluto have brought back with them a range of several Nabisco products, including Oreos, Lorna Doone, Ritz Crackers, Barnum's Animal Crackers, Social Tea Biscuits,  Fig Newtons (Mickey's and Minnie's favorite), and Milk Bones (which Fifi accepts and kisses Pluto). The film ends with Minnie kissing Mickey all over his face, and fades into "The End" superimposed over the Nabisco sign.

Home media
The short was released on December 4, 2001, on Walt Disney Treasures: Mickey Mouse in Living Color.

The short was also included in the US VHS and LaserDisc release The Spirit of Mickey and the non-US VHS and LaserDisc release Minnie's Greatest Hits, with all the Nabisco packaging replaced by generic products, and all of Minnie's lines referencing the names of the products overdubbed by Russi Taylor.  However, most DVD versions of the short contain the original uncut version, replete with the Nabisco references. Milk Bone Dog Biscuits, referenced in the original version of the film were made by Nabisco at the time of the short's production.

See also
Mickey Mouse (film series)

External links

References

1939 films
1930s color films
1939 animated films
1930s Disney animated short films
Mickey Mouse short films
Nabisco
Films directed by Hamilton Luske
Films produced by Walt Disney
Films scored by Oliver Wallace
1930s American films
World's fair films
Golden Gate International Exposition